The 2016 Olympic Wrestling Asian Qualification Tournament was the second regional qualifying tournament for the 2016 Olympics. The competition was held from 18 to 20 March 2016 in Astana, Kazakhstan.

The top two wrestlers in each weight class earn a qualification spot for their nation.

Men's freestyle

57 kg
18 March

65 kg
19 March

74 kg
18 March

86 kg
20 March

97 kg
19 March

125 kg
20 March

Men's Greco-Roman

59 kg
18 March

66 kg
20 March

75 kg
19 March

85 kg
18 March

 Janarbek Kenjeev originally qualified for the Olympics, but was later disqualified for doping, giving the spot to Ravinder Khatri. Later that decision was reverted.

98 kg
20 March

130 kg
19 March

Women's freestyle

48 kg
20 March

53 kg
18 March

 Erdenechimegiin Sumiyaa originally qualified for the Olympics, but was later disqualified for doping, giving the spot to Babita Kumari. Later that decision was reverted.

58 kg
19 March

63 kg
20 March

69 kg
18 March

75 kg
19 March

References

External links
United World Wrestling

Qualification America
Olympic Q Asia
W
Wrestling Championships